List of cities in Korea may refer to:

 List of cities in North Korea
 List of cities in South Korea (by population)

See also
Administrative divisions of Korea (disambiguation)